is a Japanese entertainer and actress who is represented by Harmony Promotion.

Filmography

TV series

Regular appearances

Quasi-regular appearances

Former regular appearances

Dramas

Advertisements

Radio series

Films

References

External links
 

Japanese gravure idols
Japanese television personalities
Japanese women pop singers
Japanese actresses
1981 births
Living people
People from Fuchū, Tokyo
21st-century Japanese singers
21st-century Japanese women singers